Fund may refer to:

 Funding is the act of providing resources, usually in form of money, or other values such as effort or time, for a project, a person, a business, or any other private or public institution
 The process of soliciting and gathering funds is known as fundraising
 An investment fund, often referred to as a fund
 Hedge fund, an investment vehicle open only to investors who are qualified in some way
 Mutual fund, a specific type of investment fund which pools money from many investors to purchase securities
 Sovereign wealth fund, a state-owned investment fund
 Fund accounting, nonprofit organizations and by the public sector
Meir Fund, American rabbi
FUND or FUND92, short names for the "International Convention on the Establishment of an International Fund for Compensation for Oil Pollution Damage, 1992."